Ajjipura  is a village in the southern state of Karnataka, India. It is located in the Hanur taluk of Chamarajanagar district. It is surrounded by Hanur, Ramapura, Cowdalli and Male Mahadeshwra Hills. Ajjipura is closely surrounded by Kurubaradoddi, Suleripalya (Kanchalli), Basappanadoddi and K Gundapura. Dommanagadde, G R Nagara, Naganna Nagara, Vaddaradoddi, Ambikapura are sub-villages.

People 
The popular spoken language is Kannada. Most of the people in Ajjipura and the surrounding villages are occupied in agriculture. Some of them are in business too. Also in the district around 150 - 160 number of Hitachi and JCB operators are from here, which made Chamarajanagara is the second largest district of Hitachi and JCB operators in the State.

Crops 
Udutore Halla mini dam located near K Gundapura which serves water for cultivation to some of the lands of K Gundapura, Ajjipura, Basappanadoddi and Suleripalya (Kanchalli) villages. The majority of the crops are depending on seasonal rains, few are drilled bore-wells on their land to get water for agriculture. Depends on the water some major crops: Ragi, rice, maize, Kambu, cotton, turmeric, sugarcane, sunflower, coconut, groundnut and some vegetables are cultivated here.

Education 
Government Higher Primary School providing education up to 7th. Currently JSS High School is the only school providing education up to 10th, which was established on 5 August 1985, apart from this a private school called Priyadarshini Vidyakendra provides education up to 7th, which was established in 1997. There is no much facility for Higher Education. Students have to travel around 8–30 km to find degree colleges in nearby towns. For graduation need to choose more distanced cities like Mysuru and Bengaluru.

Temples 
The following major temples can be found around Ajjipura
 Ankala Parameswari Temple
 Kote Maramma Temple
 Karagada Maramma Temple
 Kalamma Temple
 Muneswara Temple
 Jadeswamy Temple
 Kanive Anjaneya Temple

Demographics
 India census, Ajjipura had a population of 9,145 of which 4,658 males and 4,487 females. Ajjipura has an average literacy rate of 58%, lesser than the national average of 59.5%: male literacy is 64% and female literacy is 51%. In Ajjipura, 12% of the population are under 6 years of age.

See also
 Chamarajanagar
 Districts of Karnataka

References

External links
 https://chamrajnagar.nic.in/en/

 Srinivasa

Villages in Chamarajanagar district